ATT e Life, formerly ATT 4 Recharge is a shopping mall in Zhongshan District, Taipei, Taiwan that opened on 23 December 2018. The name "ATT" stands for "attractive". Using the homonym of "FOR", the letters are changed to the number "4", which represents the four major industries of fashion, cultural creation, entertainment, and food. "Recharge" combines fashion shopping with eating, drinking, playing, and fun, bringing all-round joy to a better life. The building in which the mall is located originally houses A.mart. At the beginning of 2017, ATT took over the original store building subordinate to Hongtai Group. The theme of the shopping mall was based on the four elements of life, fashion, food, and family. The main types of stores include catering, outdoor leisure store and family/home life. Trial operations of the mall commenced on 15 December 2018, and it officially opened on 23 December 2018. The mall changed its name to ATT e Life on July 20, 2021.

Transportation
The mall is situated in close proximity to the Miramar Entertainment Park and can be accessed via the Jiannan Road metro station on the Wenhu line of Taipei Metro.

Gallery

See also
 List of tourist attractions in Taiwan
 List of shopping malls in Taipei
 ATT 4 FUN
 Miramar Entertainment Park

References

External links
 

2018 establishments in Taiwan
Shopping malls in Taipei
Shopping malls established in 2018